Eucalyptus aspersa is a mallee, sometimes a tree that is endemic to the South West region of Western Australia. It usually has rough bark on its stems and branches, lance-shaped adult leaves, white flowers and urn-shaped fruit.

Description
It forms a lignotuber at the base of the trunk and has rough fibrous or flaky, light grey to yellowish bark that is loosely held or partly detached on part of the stems.

Taxonomy and naming
Eucalyptus aspersa was first formally described in 1993 by Stephen Hopper and Ian Brooker from a specimen collected by Brooker in 1985 near the Albany Highway north of the Serpentine River crossing. The description was published in the journal Nuytsia. The specific epithet (aspersa) is a Latin word meaning "scattered" or "sprinkled", referring to the occurrence of this species.

Distribution and habitat
This eucalypt is found on flats and ridges in the southern Wheatbelt region of Western Australia between Toodyay in the north, Collie in the west and south to Woodanilling where it grows in lateritic gravel and sandy loam soils around granite. It is found on flats and ridges where it grows in gravelly-sandy-loamy soils over granite.

See also
List of Eucalyptus species

References

Eucalypts of Western Australia
Trees of Australia
aspersa
Myrtales of Australia
Plants described in 1993
Taxa named by Ian Brooker
Taxa named by Stephen Hopper